The climate of East Anglia is generally dry and mild. The region is the driest in the United Kingdom with many areas receiving less than 600mm of rainfall a year. and locations such as St Osyth less than 500 mm on average. Rainfall is fairly evenly distributed throughout the year.

Maximum temperatures range from 6-10 °C (43-50 °F) in the winter to 20–25 °C (68–77 °F) in the summer, although temperatures have been known to reach 38 °C (102 °F). Sunshine totals tend to be higher towards the coastal areas.

Climate charts

References 

East England
East Anglia